Dina Isaakovna Kaminskaya (13 January 1919, Yekaterinoslav – 7 July 2006, Falls Church, Virginia) was a lawyer and human rights activist in the Soviet Union who was forced to emigrate in 1977 to avoid arrest. She and her husband moved to the United States. She was born in Yekaterinoslav.

The writer Yuli Daniel engaged Kaminskaya as his lawyer when, in December 1965, he was prosecuted with Andrei Sinyavsky, but the state refused to allow her to speak up in court on his behalf. She went on to defend - as far as the Soviet authorities would let her in a legal system designed as an instrument of Soviet power - Vladimir Bukovsky in 1967. She also defended Yuri Galanskov (who would die in a Soviet labour camp), Anatoly Marchenko (who would also die in camp), Larisa Bogoraz and Pavel Litvinov, and the Crimean Tatar activist Mustafa Jemilev.

Kaminskaya was prevented from defending Bukovsky in his 1971 trial and Sergei Kovalyov in 1975. In 1977, after being stripped of her license to practice as a lawyer, she was barred from defending Anatoly Shcharansky. On account of her political defense work Kaminskaya was forced into exile in 1977.

Kaminskaya's book Final Judgment: my life as a Soviet defense attorney translated by Michael Glenny was published in English in 1982. In 1984, the book was published in Russian under the title Lawyer's Notes.

The recent publication of Stars of Advocacy qualifies Dina Kaminskaya and Sofia Kallistratova as stars of the legal profession in Soviet Russia.

Kaminskaya was married to Konstantin Simis and they had one son, Dimitri K. Simes. She died in Falls Church, Virginia.

References

Further reading
 Moscow Helsinki Group, Public Group of the Assistance of the Implementation of Helsinki Accords in the USSR, Moscow Group "Helsinki" 
 Giganty i Charodei Slova. Russkie Sudebnye Oratory Vtoroi Poloviny XIX. Nachala XX Veka by V. I. Smolyarchuk
 
 
 
 
 

1919 births
2006 deaths
Lawyers from Dnipro
Soviet dissidents
Russian Jews
Kaminskaya, Dina
Soviet lawyers
Moscow Helsinki Group
Soviet human rights activists
Women human rights activists
Soviet expellees
Soviet emigrants to the United States